Sridevi Sarma (born 1972) is an American biomedical and electrical engineer known for her work in applying control theory to improve therapies for neurological disorders such as Parkinson's disease and epilepsy. She is vice dean for graduate education of the Johns Hopkins University Whiting School of Engineering, associate director of the Johns Hopkins Institute for Computational Medicine, and an associate professor in the Johns Hopkins Department of Biomedical Engineering.

Early life and education 
Sarma did her undergraduate studies at Cornell University where she received a BS in Electrical Engineering in 1994. She received her SM and PhD degrees in Electrical Engineering and Computer Science from the Massachusetts Institute of Technology in 1997 and 2006. From 2000-2003 she took a leave of absence to start a data analytics company. She was a postdoctoral fellow in the MIT Department of Brain and Cognitive Science from 2006-2009.

Work 
Sarma joined the Johns Hopkins Department of Biomedical Engineering as a professor in 2009. She was appointed as associate director of the Johns Hopkins Institute for Computational Medicine in 2017, and vice dean of graduate education for the JHU Whiting School of Engineering in 2019. She is best known for her research combining learning theory and control systems with neuroscience to create translational work aimed at improving therapies for neurological disorders, including Parkinson's disease (PD) and epilepsy. Sarma has conducted research using control theoretic tools that provided an explanation of how deep brain stimulation (DBS) therapy works for PD.

Sarma has participated in the National Geographic TV series, Brain Games.

Awards and honors 

 L'Oreal For Women in Science fellow (2008)
 National Science Foundation CAREER Award (2011)
 Presidential Early Career Award for Scientists and Engineers (2012)
 North American Neuromodulation Society Krishna Kumar New Investigator Award (2014)
 Whiting School of Engineering Robert B. Pond Excellence in Teaching Award (2015)
 GE Faculty for the Future Research Fellowship
 Burroughs Wellcome Fund Careers at the Scientific Interface Award

References 

Living people
1972 births
Johns Hopkins University alumni
Massachusetts Institute of Technology people
Cornell University alumni
Johns Hopkins Biomedical Engineering faculty